The University of Wisconsin–Stevens Point at Marshfield (UWSP at Marshfield and formerly University of Wisconsin–Marshfield/Wood County), is a satellite campus of the University of Wisconsin–Stevens Point located in Marshfield, Wisconsin, USA.

History
The campus was established in 1963 as an extension of the University of Wisconsin–Madison. The original campus consisted of three buildings and was expanded to six buildings in 1971. In 1973, the current University of Wisconsin System was formed with UW–Marshfield/Wood County becoming one of 14 charter University of Wisconsin Center two-year campuses. The campus was a member of the University of Wisconsin Colleges until July 1, 2018, when UW-Marshfield/Wood County and UW-Marathon County became satellite campuses of the University of Wisconsin-Stevens Point. On August 24, 2018, the UW System Regents approved renaming UW-Marshfield/Wood County as the University of Wisconsin–Stevens Point at Marshfield.

School
UWSP at Marshfield offers a general education associate degree and a Bachelor in Applied Arts and Sciences (BAAS) degree.  After beginning studies at UWSP at Marshfield, students may transfer to the main UWSP campus, other UW System institutions, or colleges and universities throughout the country to complete their bachelor's degrees, or complete the BAAS at UWSP at Marshfield.

The campus enrolls approximately 650 students per semester. As of 2019, Michelle Boernke is the campus executive.

Campus 
The campus, west of downtown Marshfield, Wisconsin, includes a  arboretum, a 340-seat theater, an arts center and specialist science accommodation. The campus underwent a $5.1 million expansion and remodeling project in 1998.

Athletics
Students may compete in six varsity sports in the Wisconsin Collegiate Conference: women's volleyball, men and women's basketball, men and women's tennis, and men's golf.

During the 2012 season, the women's volleyball won a share of the WCC Western Division Championship with a record of 9-2 (3-1). In the 2012–2013 season, the men's team finished with a record of 19-5 (9-1), winning the WCC Western Division title and advancing to the WCC State Tournament Final Four. That same year, the women's team finished with a record of 24-2 (19-1), winning the WCC regular season title and WCC State Championship.

References

External links
University of Wisconsin-Stevens Point at Marshfield Official website

University of Wisconsin-Stevens Point at Marshfield
Education in Wood County, Wisconsin
Educational institutions established in 1963
Buildings and structures in Wood County, Wisconsin
1963 establishments in Wisconsin
Two-year colleges in the United States
Marshfield
Marshfield